The Pakistani records in swimming are the fastest ever performances of swimmers from Pakistan, which are recognised and ratified by the Pakistan Swimming Federation. So far the national federation maintains an official list only in long course events.

All records were set in finals unless noted otherwise.

Long Course (50 m)

Men

Women

Short Course (25 m)

Men

Women

References
General
Pakistani Long Course Records – Men 30 September 2021 updated
Pakistani Long Course Records – Women  30 September 2021 updated
Specific

External links
Pakistan Swimming Federation web site

Pakistan
Records
Swimming